Joel Bertoti Padilha ( Joel; born July 24, 1980 in Torres, Rio Grande do Sul, Brazil), more commonly known as Joel, is a Brazilian football defender who last played for Rangers in the Hong Kong First Division League.

Career

Wofoo Tai Po (2006–2009)
Joel joined Wofoo Tai Po (Tai Po FC) in September 2006. He established himself as an important first team player immediately and scored a debut goal(The first home game of Wofoo Tai Po, against South China). He became an immediate solution of the team's weakness in defending header and also added a lot of quality in attacking. Besides his passing and run from deep position ability, Joel's attacking header and free kick skills made him the top scorer of the team with 6 goals in 2006/2007, along with striker Christian Annan.

Joel changed his jersey number from 28 to 6 in season 2007/2008, which he scored 7 times and became the third top scorer in the team, and the top scoring defender among the Hong Kong First Division League.

South China AA
Joel joined South China at the beginning of the 2010 season. On 18 December 2011, he scored two goals, one with a header and the other with a penalty kick, to inflict the first defeat of Kitchee's league season. In January 2012, he was named the Most Valuable Player in the 2011-12 Hong Kong First Division League for December 2011 by the Hong Kong Sports Press Association.

References

External links
Joel Bertoti Padilha at HKFA
CBF Database 

1980 births
Living people
Brazilian footballers
Brazilian expatriate footballers
Association football defenders
Sociedade Esportiva e Recreativa Caxias do Sul players
Tai Po FC players
China League One players
Guangdong Sunray Cave players
Hong Kong Rangers FC players
Hong Kong First Division League players
Brazilian expatriate sportspeople in Hong Kong
Expatriate footballers in Hong Kong
Brazilian expatriate sportspeople in China
Expatriate footballers in China
Hong Kong League XI representative players